Mount Rascal is a rural locality in the Toowoomba Region, Queensland, Australia.

Geography

History 
The locality was named during the early stages of colonisation in the region, with white pastoralists calling the Aboriginal people who defended the mountain "black rascals" for their armed resistance. In 1841, a stockman named John Hill who worked at the nearby Eton Vale estate was speared at Mount Rascal, later dying from his wounds.

Education 
There are no schools in Mount Rascal. The nearest primary schools are in Drayton and Vale View. The nearest secondary schools are in Harristown and Centenary Heights.

References

Suburbs of Toowoomba
Localities in Queensland